Frank Berghuis (born 2 May 1967) is a Dutch former professional footballer who played as a left winger.

Club career
Born in Nunspeet, Berghuis played for AGOVV, Apeldoornse Boys, PSV, FC VVV, Zwolle, Volendam, Galatasaray, Lommel and Cambuur.

International career
Nicknamed Pico, he made one international appearance for the Netherlands national team in 1989.

Personal life
His son Steven Berghuis is also a professional footballer.

References

1967 births
Living people
People from Nunspeet
Dutch footballers
Association football wingers
Netherlands international footballers
AGOVV Apeldoorn players
PSV Eindhoven players
VVV-Venlo players
PEC Zwolle players
FC Volendam players
Galatasaray S.K. footballers
K.F.C. Lommel S.K. players
SC Cambuur players
Eredivisie players
Belgian Pro League players
Eerste Divisie players
Dutch expatriate footballers
Dutch expatriate sportspeople in Turkey
Expatriate footballers in Turkey
Dutch expatriate sportspeople in Belgium
Expatriate footballers in Belgium
Footballers from Gelderland